= Anna Davtyan =

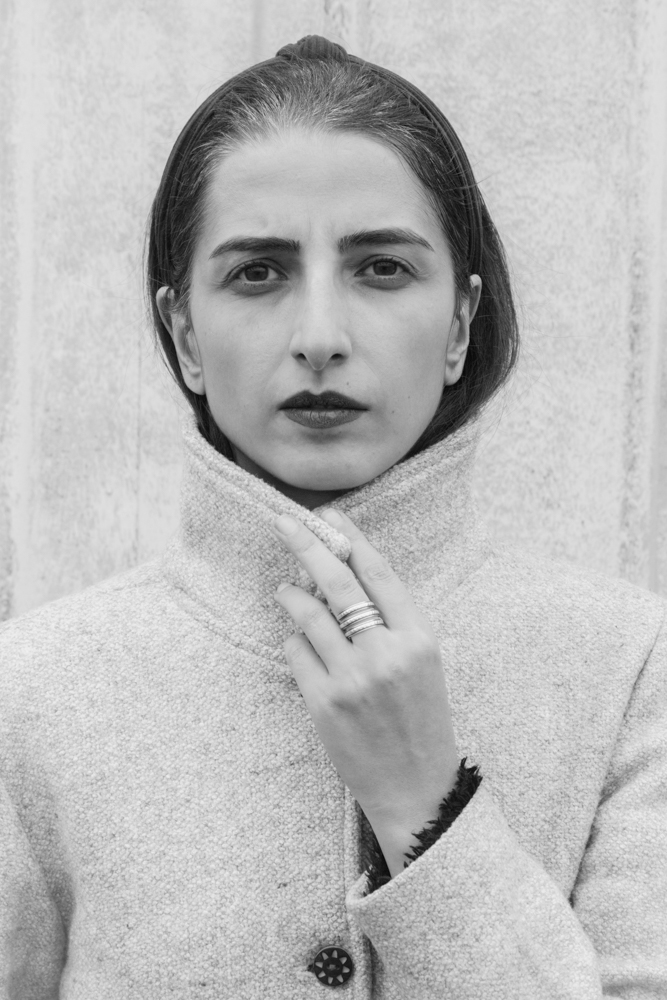
- Born: February 14, 1983 (age 43); Artik, Shirak
- Education: Yerevan State University
- Occupations: Writer, Photographer, Translator

Anna Davtyan (born February 14, 1983) is a contemporary Armenian writer, photographer and translator. She lives and works in Armenia.

== Biography ==
Anna Davtyan was born on February 14, 1983 in the Artik, Armenia. She graduated from the English Language and Literature department of the Faculty of Romance and Germanic Philology of Yerevan State University.
